Philip L. Matyszak is a British non-fiction author, primarily of historical works relating to ancient Rome.

Biography
Matyszak studied ancient history at Royal Holloway, University of London, graduating with a Bachelor of Arts (BA) degree. He then studied Roman history at St John's College, Oxford, graduating with a Doctor of Philosophy (DPhil) degree. His doctoral thesis submitted in 1993, and was titled "Dominance in the Roman senate from Sulla to the Principate".

Matyszak's first career was as a journalist. In addition to being a professional author, he also teaches ancient history for the Institute of Continuing Education, Cambridge University.

Published works

References

External links
 Personal website
Philip Matyszak in Amazon

English classical scholars
Alumni of St John's College, Oxford
Living people
People from Zvishavane
Year of birth missing (living people)
Academics of the Institute of Continuing Education